J.P. College of Engineering is an engineering college offering undergraduate and postgraduate engineering courses (B.E,B.TECH and M.E). It is situated at Agarakattu, Ayikkudi, Tenkasi, Tenkasi district, Tamil Nadu, India. J.P means Jesintha Peter. Thiru. S.Peter Alphonse, Chairman of Grace Swaminathan Educational and Charitable Trust, established J.P College of Engineering in 2007.
In the year 2012, the college was bought and run by the DMI Foundations. From then the institute was run by the Sisters of Daughters of Mary Immaculate and Fathers of Missionaries of Mary Immaculate.

References

Engineering colleges in Tamil Nadu
Education in Tirunelveli district
Educational institutions established in 2007
2007 establishments in Tamil Nadu